The 1989 Swiss Indoors was a men's tennis tournament played on indoor carpet courts at the St. Jakobshalle in Basel, Switzerland that was part of the 1989 Nabisco Grand Prix circuit. It was the 20th edition of the tournament and took place from 3 October until 8 October 1989. Unseeded Jim Courier won the singles title.

Finals

Singles

 Jim Courier defeated  Stefan Edberg 7–6, 3–6, 2–6, 6–0, 7–5
 It was Courier's first singles title of his career.

Doubles

 Udo Riglewski /  Michael Stich defeated  Omar Camporese /  Claudio Mezzadri 6–3, 4–6, 6–0

References

External links
 ITF tournament edition profile

Swiss Indoors
Swiss Indoors
1989 in Swiss tennis